This is a list of climate change initiatives of international, national, regional, and local political initiatives to take action on climate change (global warming).

A Climate Action Plan (CAP) is a set of strategies intended to guide efforts for climate change mitigation.

International initiatives 

 United Nations Framework Convention on Climate Change
 Kyoto Protocol
 International Carbon Action Partnership
Global Environment Facility
 Muslim Seven Year Action Plan on Climate Change
Paris Agreement

Europe

North America

National initiatives

Local initiatives

United States

See also 
 List of environmental agreements
 Nationally determined contributions (NDC)
 Regional climate change initiatives in the United States

References

Further reading

External links 

 Intergovernmental Panel on Climate Change
 United Nations Framework Convention on Climate Change
 US Clean Energy States - an alliance of US states working together to promote renewable energy
 Cities for Climate Protection - reductions in local greenhouse gas emissions, improvements in air quality, and enhanced urban livability
 Official list of local Climate Action Plans in California for 2019
 Kirsten Engel and Barak Orbach, Micro-Motives for State and Local Climate Change Initiatives Harvard Law & Policy Review, Vol. 2, pp. 119–137, 2008
 Nigeria climate action plan,  

Initiatives
Initiatives
Climate action plans